"I've Come to Life" is a pop song by Swiss singer Edita Abdieski. The track was released as Abdieski's debut single on November 10, 2010 in German-speaking Europe, following her triumph on the German television talent show X Factor the same day. It reached the top ten in Germany and Switzerland.

Music video
A music video for "I've Come to Life," directed by Sandra Marschner, made its premiere on Bild.de on 23 November 2010.

Track listing

Notes
  signifies an additional producer

Charts

Release history

References

2010 singles
2010 songs
Columbia Records singles